Timothy Bruce Spahr (born 1970) is an American astronomer and prolific discoverer of minor planets.

From 2000–2014 he worked at the Center for Astrophysics  Harvard & Smithsonian Minor Planet Center. From September 2006 to December 2014 he was the director of Minor Planet Center. He is a co-discoverer of Callirrhoe, a moon of Jupiter, and of Albiorix, a moon of Saturn. He also discovered two periodic comets: 171P/Spahr and P/1998 U4. He is credited by the Minor Planet Center with the discovery of 58 minor planets.

Dr. Spahr is currently the CEO of NEO Sciences LLC, a consulting firm specializing in characterization of Near-Earth Objects (NEOs) including PHAs (Potentially Hazardous Asteroids), Asteroid and Comet science, and planetary defense coordination.  Dr. Spahr is the manager of the UN-sanctioned International Asteroid Warning Network (IAWN) and also serves on the advisory council of The Planetary Society where he is the administrator of the Shoemaker NEO Grant program. 
 
The Florian asteroid 2975 Spahr was named after him.

List of discovered minor planets

References

External links 
 An interview to Timothy Spahr (Minor Planet Center)
 Old equipment finds big asteroid nearby (asteroid: 1996 JA1)

American astronomers
Discoverers of asteroids
Discoverers of comets

Harvard University staff
Planetary scientists
Living people
1970 births